The Commission on Food Safety of the State Council is a policy coordination committee with ultimate oversight on food safety in China. As it is an ad hoc coordination body it should not be confused with the established commissions and ministries which report into the State Council. The commission is headed by the Vice-Premier of the State Council, Han Zheng, who is also a member of the Politburo Standing Committee of the Chinese Communist Party.

The commission was established in 2010 after a series of food safety incidents reduced the trust of the Chinese public as well as importers of Chinese made food outside of China. For example, the 2008 baby milk powder scandal caused major international controversy. The commission was initially headed by Li Keqiang, then the top-ranked Vice-Premier of the State Council and a member of the Politburo Standing Committee, who was assisted by two deputies, Vice Premier Wang Qishan and Vice Premier Hui Liangyu.

The membership of the group consists mostly of vice-ministerial level officials.

Leaders 
 Li Keqiang (2010–2013, then serving as Vice Premier and a member of the Politburo Standing Committee)
 Han Zheng (2013–present, serving as Vice Premier and a member of the Politburo Standing Committee)

Current composition
Leader
Han Zheng, Politburo Standing Committee, Vice Premier of the People's Republic of China
Deputy Leader
Wang Yang, Politburo, Vice Premier of the People's Republic of China
Chief of General Office
Zhang Yong
Members
Zhang Yong, Deputy Secretary-General of the State Council, Chair of the China Food and Drug Administration, General Office chief
Bi Jingquan, Deputy Secretary-General of the State Council
Wu Hengquan, Deputy Head, Central Propaganda Department
Wang Qijiang, Deputy Secretary-General of the Central Political and Legal Affairs Commission
Hu Zucai, Vice Chairman of the National Development and Reform Commission
Wang Weizhong, Vice Minister of Science and Technology
Zhu Hongren, Engineer-in-chief, Ministry of Industry and Information
Huang Ming, Vice Minister of Public Security
Xiang Chunsheng, Vice Minister of Supervision
Wang Bao'an, Vice Minister of Finance
Li Ganjie, Vice Minister of Environmental Protection
Han Changbin, Vice Minister of Commerce
Jiang Zengwei, Vice Minister of Commerce
Chen Xiaohong, Vice Chair of the National Health and Family Planning Commission
Yu Guangzhou, Head of the China Customs Administration
Ma Zhengqi, Head of the State Administration for Industry and Commerce
Zhi Shuping, Head of the General Administration of Quality Supervision, Inspection and Quarantine
Yuan Shuhong, Deputy Chief, Legislative Affairs Office
Wang Guoqing, Deputy Chief, State Council Information Office
Ren Zhengxiao, chairman, State Administration of Grain

See also
Food safety incidents in China
Gutter oil

References 

State Council of the People's Republic of China
Food safety in China